Reo or REO may refer to:

People with the name
, Japanese professional shogi player
, Japanese footballer
, Japanese footballer
 Don Reo (born 1946), American television writer and producer

Places
 Reo, Estonia, village in Saaremaa Parish, Saare County, Estonia
 Reo, Indiana, an unincorporated community in Spencer County
 Réo, town in Burkina Faso
 REO, FAA identifier for Rome State Airport in Rome, Oregon

Government and politics 
 Registration and Electoral Office of Hong Kong

Arts, entertainment, and media
 R.E.O. (album), 1976 album from REO Speedwagon
 REO Speedwagon, a classic rock band

Language
 Reo, a Māori language word meaning voice or language, as in te reo Māori
 Kōhanga Reo, a pre-school language-recovery program in the Māori language revival
 Reo Coordination Language, a computer programming language

Other uses
 Reo (deity), Lusitanian god
 Reo (spider), a spider genus of family Mimetidae
 Rare earth oxide, oxide of a rare-earth element  
 Real estate owned, a class of property
 REO Motor Car Company (1905–1975), a former American car and truck manufacturer, founded by Ransom E. Olds

Japanese masculine given names